Campos y Salave is one of four parishes (administrative divisions) in Tapia de Casariego, a municipality within the province and autonomous community of Asturias, in northern Spain.

Parishes in Tapia de Casariego